The raspberry is the edible fruit of several plant species.

Raspberry may also refer to:

 Bramble Raspberry or Rubus fruticosus, a species of blackberry
 Raspberry (color), a bright crimson-rose color named for the fruit
 Blowing a raspberry, making an obnoxious sound to signal disrespect
 William Raspberry (1935–2012), American journalist

Places
 Raspberry, Arkansas, US
 Raspberry, British Columbia, Canada

Music
 Raspberries (band), a 1970s pop-rock group
 Raspberries (album), the 1972 debut album by Raspberries
 "Raspberry", a song by Sloan from Smeared

See also
 
 
 Rasberry (disambiguation)